Jovial may refer to:

 Brice Jovial (born 1984), French football striker
 JOVIAL, a programming language
 Jovial High School, Yacharam, Telangana, India
 Hamster Jovial, a French comic book series 
 The archaic adjectival form of:
 Jupiter (mythology)
 Jupiter, the planet

See also
 Jovian (disambiguation)
 Joy, a positive emotion